Aşağı Ləgər may refer to:
 Aşağı Ləgər, Khachmaz, Azerbaijan
 Aşağı Ləgər, Qusar, Azerbaijan
 Ləgərqışlaq, Azerbaijan